"Cecilia", full title "Does Your Mother Know You're Out Cecilia", is a 1926 song written by Dave Dreyer with lyrics by Harry Ruby. The song was first recorded by Whispering Jack Smith on Victor Records. Johnny Hamp was another who enjoyed success with the song in 1926.

Versions
Dick Jurgens with vocal by Ronnie Kemper (Columbia 37342) 1940, reissued 1947  
Harry Cool 1947
Louis Prima 1947
Rose Murphy 1948
Frankie Carle 1952, 
Grady Martin And His Slew Foot Five 1955
Somethin' Smith and The Redheads 1956, 
Chet Atkins 1956, 
The Music Of David Seville 1957, 
Henri René and His Orchestra 1959, 
Max Bygraves with Ted Heath and His Music 1959
The Jonah Jones Quartet 1961
Frankie Vaughan 1962
Bing Crosby (from the 1962 album On the Happy Side)
Mr. Mike, Australian singer, 1963, 
Brad Swanson 1970, 
Floyd Vivino performing as "Oogie" 2007
Bill Ramsey (singer) German version "Cecilia (Schau, schau mich nicht so an)" Dreyer, Bartels
NRBQ 1977

References

1926 songs
Songs with music by Dave Dreyer
Songs with lyrics by Harry Ruby